Friendship is a historic home located at Stevensville, Queen Anne's County, Maryland.  It is a -story dwelling of Flemish bond brick construction and was built in two stages, both dating to the 18th century. The earliest section is traditionally believed to date to the 1740s. Also on the property is a frame smoke house and dairy.

It was listed on the National Register of Historic Places in 1994.

References

External links
, including photo from 1979, at Maryland Historical Trust

Houses on the National Register of Historic Places in Maryland
Houses in Queen Anne's County, Maryland
Houses completed in 1740
Kent Island, Maryland
National Register of Historic Places in Queen Anne's County, Maryland
1740 establishments in Maryland